The Cuttitta Cup is a trophy in rugby union awarded to the winner of the annual Six Nations Championship match between Italy and Scotland.

The trophy commemorates Massimo Cuttitta, a former Italian captain and Scotland scrum coach, who died of COVID-19 in 2021 at the age of 54. The title was first contested in 2022, following the 2022 Six Nations Championship match between the competing nations, and was presented by his brothers Marcello and Michele Cuttitta.

It was designed and manufactured from solid silver by Edinburgh jewellers Hamilton & Inches, who have also cared for the Calcutta Cup and crafted the Doddie Weir Cup. The handles of the cup represent two props, in memory of Massimo.

The establishment of this trophy results in Scotland competing for a trophy in every Six Nations match: Calcutta Cup (v England), Centenary Quaich (v Ireland), Auld Alliance Trophy (v France), Doddie Weir Cup (v Wales) and Cuttitta Cup (v Italy).

Matches

Results

See also 
 Rugby union trophies and awards

References

Six Nations Championship trophies
International rugby union competitions hosted by Italy
International rugby union competitions hosted by Scotland
Rugby union international rivalry trophies
Recurring sporting events established in 2022